The 2022 ICC Men's T20 World Cup Global Qualifier B was a cricket tournament that was played in July 2022 in Zimbabwe, as one of two global tournaments that together formed the final stage of the qualification process for the 2022 ICC Men's T20 World Cup. In April 2018, the International Cricket Council (ICC) granted full international status to Twenty20 men's matches played between member sides from 1 January 2019 onwards. Therefore, all the matches in the Global Qualifiers were played as Twenty20 Internationals (T20Is). Global Qualifier B was contested by eight teams that advanced from their Regional Finals, were eliminated in the first round of the 2021 ICC Men's T20 World Cup, or were one of the highest ranked sides not already qualified to this stage. The eight teams were placed in two groups, with two sides from each group advancing to the semi-finals. The two teams that reached the final of the Global Qualifier were advanced to the 2022 ICC Men's T20 World Cup in Australia.

The United States and Jersey announced that they would play a series of practice games against each other and Namibia in Windhoek before travelling to Zimbabwe. In June 2022, the ICC confirmed the full schedule for the Global Qualifier B tournament.

In Group A, United States and Zimbabwe both won their first two matches to secure their places in the semi-finals of the tournament. The Netherlands won their first two matches in Group B to also qualify for the semi-finals. Despite losing their final group match, Papua New Guinea became the fourth and final team to qualify for the semi-finals, due to a superior net run rate over Hong Kong. The Netherlands and Zimbabwe reached the final of the tournament to qualify for the 2022 ICC Men's T20 World Cup. Hosts Zimbabwe beat the Netherlands by 37 runs in the final to win the tournament.

Squads
The following squads were named for the tournament.

Ali Khan suffered a fractured forearm during the USA's match against Jersey and was ruled out of the rest of the tournament. Siva Kumar was later named as Khan's replacement. Zimbabwe's Tendai Chatara fractured his collarbone, also in a match against Jersey, with Tony Munyonga replacing him for the remaining matches of the tournament.

Group stage

Group A

 Advanced to the Semi-Finals
 Advanced to the Consolation play-offs

Group B

 Advanced to the Semi-Finals
 Advanced to the Consolation play-offs

Consolation play-offs

Bracket

5th Place semi-finals

7th-place play-off

5th-place play-off

Play-offs

Bracket

Semi-finals

3rd-place play-off

Final

Final standings
These were the final standings following the conclusion of the tournament.

 Qualified for the 2022 ICC Men's T20 World Cup.

See also
 2022 ICC Men's T20 World Cup Global Qualifier A

References

External links
 Series home at ESPN Cricinfo

Associate international cricket competitions in 2021–22
Qualifiers
ICC